Colpes is a village and municipality in Catamarca Province in northwestern Argentina, located in the Pomán Department.

References

Populated places in Catamarca Province